Achtymichuk is a Ukrainian surname. Notable people with the surname include:

 Gene Achtymichuk (born 1932), Canadian ice hockey player
 George Achtymichuk (born  1935), Canadian curler

Surnames of Ukrainian origin